Staffordshire is a landlocked county in the West Midlands of England. It adjoins Cheshire to the north west, Derbyshire and Leicestershire to the east, Warwickshire to the south east, West Midlands and Worcestershire to the south, and Shropshire to the west. The historic county of Staffordshire includes Wolverhampton, Walsall, and West Bromwich, these three being removed for administrative purposes in 1974 to the new West Midlands authority.   The resulting administrative area of Staffordshire has a narrow southwards protrusion that runs west of West Midlands to the border of Worcestershire. The city of Stoke-on-Trent was removed from the admin area in the 1990s to form a unitary authority, but is still part of Staffordshire for ceremonial and traditional purposes.

The historic county has an area of 781,000 acres (1,250 sq. miles) and at the first census in 1801 had a population of 239,153.

Iron Age and Roman
Early British remains exist in various parts of the county; and a large number of barrows have been opened in which human bones, urns, fibulae, stone hammers, armlets, pins, pottery and other articles have been found. In the neighbourhood of Wetton, near Dovedale, on the site called Borough Holes, no fewer than twenty-three barrows were opened, and British ornaments have been found in Needwood Forest, the district between the lower Dove and the angle of the Trent to the south. Several Roman camps also remain, as at Knave's Castle on Watling Street, near Brownhills.

Anglo-Saxon
The county symbol, the Staffordshire Knot, is seen on an Anglian stone cross that dates from around the year 805.  The cross still stands in Stoke churchyard.  Thus the Knot is either i) an ancient Mercian symbol or ii) a symbol adopted from the Irish Christianity, Christianity having been brought to Staffordshire by Irish monks from Lindisfarne about AD 650.

The district which is now Staffordshire was invaded in the 6th century by a tribe of Angles who settled about Tamworth, afterwards famous as a residence of the Mercian kings, and later made their way beyond Cannock Chase, through the passages afforded by the Sow valley in the north and Watling Street in the south. The district was frequently overrun by the Danes, who in 910 were defeated at Tettenhall, and again at Wednesfield, and it was after Edward the Elder had finally expelled the Northmen from Mercia that the land of the south Mercians was formed into a shire around the fortified burgh which he had made in 914 at Stafford. 

The county probably first came into being in the decade after the year 913; that being the date at which Stafford – the strategic military fording-point for an army to cross the Trent – became a secure fortified stronghold and the new capital of Mercia under Queen Æthelflæd.

The county is first mentioned by name in the Anglo-Saxon Chronicle in 1016 when it was harried by Canute.

Norman Conquest
The resistance which Staffordshire opposed William the Conqueror was punished by ruthless harrying and confiscation, and the Domesday Survey supplies evidence of the depopulated and impoverished condition of the county, which at this period contained but 64 mills, whereas Dorset, a smaller county, contained 272. No Englishman was allowed to retain estates of any importance after the Conquest, and the chief lay proprietors at the time of the survey were Earl Roger of Montgomery; Earl Hugh of Chester; Henry de Ferrers, who held Burton and Tutbury Castles; Robert de Stafford; William Fitz-Ansculf, afterwards created first Baron Dudley; Richard Forester; Rainald Bailgiol; Ralph Fitz Hubert and Nigel de Stafford. The Ferrers and Staffords long continued to play a leading part in Staffordshire history, and Turstin, who held Drayton under William Fitz Ansculf, was the ancestor of the Bassets of Drayton. At the time of the survey Burton was the only monastery in Staffordshire, but foundations of canons existed at Stafford, Wolverhampton, Tettenhall, Lichfield, Penkridge and Tamworth, while others at Hanbury, Stone, Strensall and Trentham had been either destroyed or absorbed before the Conquest.

Later middle ages
In the 13th century Staffordshire formed the archdeaconry of Stafford, including the deaneries of Stafford, Newcastle, Alton and Leek, Tamworth and Tutbury, Lapley and Creigull. In 1535 the deanery of Newcastle was combined with that of Stone, the deaneries remaining otherwise unaltered until 1866, when they were increased to twenty. The archdeaconry of Stoke-on-Trent was formed in 1878, and in 1896 the deaneries were brought to their present number; the archdeaconry of Stafford comprising Handsworth, Himley, Lichfield, Penkridge, Rugeley, Stafford, Tamworth, Trysull, Tutbury, Walsall, Wednesbury, West Bromwich and Wolverhampton; the archdeaconry of Stoke-on-Trent comprising Alstonfield, Cheadle, Eccleshall, Hanley, Leek, Newcastle-under-Lyme, Stoke-on- Trent, Trentham and Uttoxeter.
In the wars of the reign of Henry III. most of the great families of Staffordshire, including the Bassets and the Ferrers, supported Simon de Montfort, and in 1263 Prince Edward ravaged all the lands of Earl Robert Ferrers in this county and destroyed Tutbury Castle. During the Wars of the Roses, Eccleshall was for a time the headquarters of Queen Margaret, and in 1459 the Lancastrians were defeated at Blore Heath.

Hundreds of Staffordshire
The five hundreds of Staffordshire existed since the Domesday Survey, and the boundaries have remained practically unchanged until the twentieth century. Edingale, however, was then included under Derbyshire, and Tyrley under Shropshire, while Cheswardine, Chipnall and part of Bobbington, now in Shropshire, were assessed under Staffordshire. The hundreds of Offlow and Totmonslow had their names from sepulchral monuments of Saxon commanders. The shire court for Staffordshire was held at Stafford, and the assizes at Wolverhampton, Stafford and Lichfield, until by act of parliament of 1558 the assizes and sessions were fixed at Stafford, where they are still held.

The origin of the hundred dates from the division of his kingdom by King Alfred the Great into counties, hundreds and tithings. From the beginning, Staffordshire was divided into the hundreds of Totmonslow, Pirehill, Offlow, Cuttleston and Seisdon.  

The hundredal division of Staffordshire differs markedly from that of the counties to the south and west in showing far greater stability. All the Domesday hundreds are kept practically unchanged down to modern times. Also in the size of the hundreds. The Staffordshire hundreds, five in number, are on the whole far larger than any in the adjacent counties; more especially as regards northern Staffordshire. The two hundreds in the south-west are of more normal extent. It seems to be due chiefly to the nature of the county. Northern Staffordshire is to a large extent moorland, which must have been unattractive to early settlers. It is noteworthy, as showing where the centres of these hundreds lay, that the meeting-places of the two northern hundreds (Pirehill and Totmonslow) are in the extreme south of the respective hundreds. Southern Staffordshire was largely a forest-district. The southern part of Seisdon hundred was covered by Kinver Forest, and large parts of the two hundreds in the central part of the county, those of Cuttleston and Offlow, must have been occupied by Cannock Forest. The cultivated areas of these hundreds must in early days have been considerably smaller than at present.

Civil War
In the English Civil War of the 17th century Staffordshire supported the parliamentary cause and was placed under Lord Brooke. Tamworth, Lichfield and Stafford, however, were garrisoned for King Charles, and Lichfield Cathedral withstood a siege in 1643, in which year the Royalists were victorious at Hopton Heath, but lost their leader, the Earl of Northampton. In 1745 the Young Pretender advanced as far as Leek in this county.

Industrial history
A large proportion of Staffordshire in Norman times was waste and uncultivated ground, but the moorlands of the north afforded excellent pasturage for sheep, and in the 14th century Wolverhampton was a staple town for wool. In the 13th century mines of coal and iron are mentioned at Walsall, and ironstone was procured at Sedgley and Eccleshall. In the 15th century both coal and iron were extensively worked. Thus in the 17th century the north of the county yielded coal, lead, copper, marble and millstones, while the rich meadows maintained great dairies; the woodlands of the south supplied timber, salt, black marble and alabaster; the clothing trade flourished about Tamworth, Burton, and Newcastle-under-Lyme; and hemp and flax were grown all over the county. The potteries are of remote origin, but were improved in the 17th century by two brothers, the Elers, from Amsterdam, who introduced the method of salt glazing, and in the 18th century they were rendered famous by the achievements of Josiah Wedgwood.

Parliament
Staffordshire was represented by two members in the parliament of 1290, and in 1295 the borough of Stafford also returned two members. Lichfield was represented by two members in 1304, and Newcastle-under-Lyme in 1355. Tamworth returned two members in 1562. Under the Reform Act of 1832 the county returned four members in four divisions, and the boroughs of Stoke-upon-Trent and Wolverhampton were represented by two members each, and Walsall by one member. Under the Act of 1867 the county returned six members in three divisions and Wednesbury returned one member.

Antiquities
The most noteworthy churches in the county are found in the large towns, and are described under their respective headings. Such are the beautiful cathedral of Lichfield, and the churches of Eccleshall, Leek, Penkridge St Mary's at Stafford, Tamworth, Tutbury, and St Peter's at Wolverhampton. Checkley, 4 miles south of Cheadle, shows good Norman and Early English details, and there are carved stones of pre-Norman date in the churchyard. Armitage, south-east of Rugeley, has a church showing good Norman work. Brewood church, 4 miles south-west of Penkridge, is Early English. This village gives name to an ancient forest. Audley church, north-west of Newcastle-under-Lyme, is a good example of Early Decorated work. Remains of ecclesiastical foundations are generally slight, but those of the Cistercian abbey of Croxden, north-west of Uttoxeter, are fine Early English, and at Ranton, west of Stafford, the Perpendicular tower and other portions of an Augustinian foundation remain. Among medieval domestic remains may be mentioned the castles of Stafford, Tamworth and Tutbury, with that of Chartley, north-east of Stafford, which dates from the 13th century. Here is also a timbered hall, in the park of which a breed of wild cattle is maintained. Beaudesert, south of Rugeley, is a fine Elizabethan mansion in a beautiful undulating demesne. In the south-west, near Stourbridge, are Enville, a Tudor mansion with grounds laid out by the poet Shenstone, and Stourton Castle, embodying portions of the 15th century, where Reginald, Cardinal Pole, was born in 1500. Among numerous modern seats may be named Ingestre, Ilam Hall, Alton Towers, Shugborough, Patteshull, Keele Hall, and Trentham.

See also
Lost houses of Staffordshire

References

See Robert Plot, Natural History of Staffordshire (Oxford, 1686); S. Erdeswick, Survey of Staffordshire (London, 1717; 4th ed., by T. Harwood, London, 1844); Stebbing Shaw, History and Antiquities of Staffordshire, &c., vol. i., ii., pt. i. (London, 1798—1801); William Pitt, Topographical History of Staffordshire (Newcastle-under-Lyme, 1817); Simeon Shaw, History of the Staffordshire Potteries (Hanley, 1829); Robert Garner, Natural History of the County of Stafford (London, 1844—1860); William Salt, Archaeological Society, Collections for a History of Staffordshire (1880), vol. i.; Victoria County History; Staffordshire.

Attibution:

Further reading
 
 Victoria County History for Staffordshire: detailed local histories of the county, organised by parish. Full text of several of the volumes on British History Online.

External links
 

 
Staffordshire
Local government in Staffordshire
Staffordshire